Josefa Vueti (born 6 February 1979 in Levuka) is a Fijian weightlifter. Vueti represented Fiji at the 2008 Summer Olympics in Beijing, where he competed for the men's middleweight category (77 kg). Vueti placed twenty-third in this event, as he successfully lifted 124 kg in the single-motion snatch, and hoisted 155 kg in the two-part, shoulder-to-overhead clean and jerk, for a total of 279 kg.

References

External links

NBC Olympics Profile

Fijian male weightlifters
1979 births
Living people
Olympic weightlifters of Fiji
Weightlifters at the 2008 Summer Olympics
People from Levuka
I-Taukei Fijian people
20th-century Fijian people
21st-century Fijian people